Hillsdale High School is a public high school near Jeromesville, Ohio, United States. The building is located in Mohican Township in between the villages of Jeromesville and Hayesville. Athletic teams are known as the Falcons, and the school colors are Columbia Blue, Navy Blue and gold. The school opened in the fall of 1964.

History
The idea for Hillsdale High School was born in 1961 when Jeromesville and Hayesville decided to merge their school districts.  Joyce Justice's suggestion for the name "Hillsdale" was selected as the winner of the contest to name the school.  A committee made up of representatives from both districts agreed on the school colors of Columbia blue and gold, and the nickname the "Falcons".  The school eventually opened in the fall of 1964. The first senior class graduated in 1965.

Hillsdale was a member of the Firelands Conference until 1970, when they were asked to replace Triway High School in the Wayne County Athletic League, despite not being located in Wayne County.  Hillsdale recorded the first WCAL football championship for a non-Wayne County school in 2010 when they won the league title outright.

State championships

 Girls Softball - 1979, 1994, 1996, 1999, 2000, 2010, 2018

References

External links
 

High schools in Ashland County, Ohio
Public high schools in Ohio
1964 establishments in Ohio